George Gabin (April 16, 1931 – January 7, 2012) was an American artist and art educator.

Born in Brooklyn, New York, United States, Gabin was a prolific painter whose work spanned more than six decades, Gabin's realist paintings and drawings have been described as "atmospheric [and] quasi-surreal." He exhibited nationally, and his work is in more than 100 collections in the United States.

Gabin studied art at the Brooklyn Museum Art School in Brooklyn, New York, from 1949–54. He also studied at the Art Students League in New York City from 1950–54. His teachers included Reginald Marsh, Ivan Olinsky, and Will Barnet.

From 1963 until 1970, Gabin taught at the New England School of Art and Design, Boston, Mass. In 1970, he and a group of fellow artists, which included Oliver Balf, Joseph Jeswald, Roger Martin, Reno Pisano, Paul Scott, Jim Sweeney and Vincent Varvaro, founded Montserrat School of Visual Art, the forerunner of Montserrat College of Art in Beverly, Mass. Gabin served on the faculty at Montserrat until his retirement in 1998. He was Professor Emeritus at the college until his death in January 2012.

Gabin died in Somerville, Massachusetts, in January 2012.

References

Further reading
 A World Apart: The Legacy of George Gabin. Wilkes-Barre, PA: Sardoni Art Gallery, Wilkes University, 2014.
 George Gabin: Reflections. Somerville, MA: Brickbottom Studio. 2013.
 Wendy Killeen. "Free to Imagine: Montserrat Traces 20-year history with alumni art exhibit." Boston Globe. North Weekly. September 10, 2000.

External links
 Stone Gabin Studios 
 Chase Young Gallery, Boston, Mass.
 The Guild of Boston Artists 
 

1931 births
2012 deaths
20th-century American painters
American male painters
21st-century American painters
21st-century American male artists
Art Students League of New York alumni
Montserrat College of Art faculty
20th-century American male artists